John Leahy is the name of:

 Australia
 John Leahy (footballer) (1941–1980), Australian rules footballer
 John Leahy (Australian politician) (1854–1909), Australian Conservative politician, 1893–1909
 Ireland
 John Leahy (hurler) (born 1969), former Irish hurler
 John Patrick Kenneth Leahy (1907–1963), Irish Roman Catholic priest
 Johnny Leahy (1890–1949), Irish hurler
 John Leahy (Irish politician), Leader of Renua Ireland
 United Kingdom
 John Leahy (diplomat) (1928–2015), former senior British diplomat
 United States of America
 John Leahy (executive) (born 1950), American executive at Airbus
 John E. Leahy (1842–1915), American politician
 John Martin Leahy (1886–1967), American short story writer, novelist and artist